The yellow-headed day gecko (Phelsuma klemmeri), also commonly called Klemmer's day gecko, the neon day gecko, or the cheerful day gecko, is a small diurnal species of gecko, a lizard in the family Gekkonidae. This endangered species is endemic to northwestern Madagascar and inhabits coastal forests (both dry and humid), dwelling on bamboo. The yellow-headed day gecko feeds on insects and nectar.

Etymology
The specific name, klemmeri, is in honor of German herpetologist Konrad Klemmer.

Description
P. klemmeri  are very small, reaching a total length (including tail) of 3.25-3.75″ (8.3-9.5cm). The body colour of this slender and long-snouted gecko is turquoise blue at the upper and mid-back. The lower back is light brown. Most of the tail is turquoise blue. Remarkable is the laterally flattened body. Another typical characteristic is the yellow head. A dark black spot is present behind the eye, followed by a black stripe which extends to the rear extremities. The legs and toes are brown speckled. The ventral side is grayish white. The sexes can easily be distinguished by the orange color around the femoral pores of the males.

Geographic range
P. klemmeri inhabits northwest Madagascar, along the coast. It is only known from the Ampasindava Peninsula (at Antsatsaka) and near Mandrozo Lake.

Habitat

P. klemmeri typically lives in bamboo forests. It sometimes shares its habitat with Phelsuma seippi and Phelsuma madagascariensis grandis. P. klemmeri is most commonly found on yellow bamboo canes, but may be found on green bamboo or other nearby foliage. When threatened, P. klemmeri will hide inside narrow cracks in the bamboo.

Diet
P. klemmeri feeds on various insects and other invertebrates. It also likes to lick soft sweet fruit, pollen, and nectar.

Behaviour
P. klemmeri is primarily active during the day (diurnal) and likes to bask. It often lives in small groups.

Reproduction
The female P. klemmeri lays a pair of eggs and hides them in bamboo canes. At a temperature of 27 °C (80.6 °F), the young will hatch after approximately 39–52 days. Each juvenile measures .

Captivity
The species P. klemmeri is bred extensively in captivity, and the IUCN thinks it unlikely that it is still wild-caught.

When well cared-for, this species may live for up to 15 years.

References

Further reading
Glaw F, Vences M (1994). A Fieldguide to the Amphibians and Reptiles of Madagascar, Second Edition. Cologne, Germany: Vences & Glaw Verlag / Serpents Tale. 480 pp. .
Henkel F-W; Schmidt W (1995). Amphibien und Reptilien Madagaskars, der Maskarenen, Seychellen und Komoren. Stuttgart: Ulmer. . (in German).
McKeown, Sean (1993). The general care and maintenance of day geckos. Lakeside, California: Advanced Vivarium Systems.
Seipp R (1991). "Eine neue Art der Gattung Phelsuma Gray 1825 von Madagaskar (Reptilia: Sauria: Gekkonidae)". Senckenbergiana Biologica 71: 11–14. (Phelsuma klemmeri, new species). (in German).

Phelsuma
Endemic fauna of Madagascar
Reptiles described in 1991